Sir Andrew John Pocock  (born 23 August 1955) is a British former diplomat who was High Commissioner to Nigeria and Permanent Representative to ECOWAS 2012–15.

Early life and education
Born in Trinidad and Tobago to John and Vida Pocock, Andrew Pocock was educated at St Mary's College, Trinidad, Queen Mary, University of London (BA, MA) and Peterhouse, Cambridge (PhD).

Career
Pocock joined the Foreign Office in 1981. He has been stationed in Lagos (1983-1986), Washington DC, United States (1988-1992), Canberra (1997-2001), Dar es Salaam (2003-2006), Harare, Zimbabwe (2006-2009), Canada (2011-2012) and Nigeria (2012–15). In July 2015 the Foreign Office announced that Pocock was to retire from the Diplomatic Service.

Personal life
Pocock is married to Julie Pocock.

Honours
In 2016, he was awarded the Hubert Walter Award for Reconciliation and Interfaith Cooperation by the Archbishop of Canterbury "for his service to peace and stability in Nigeria".

References

POCOCK, Dr Andrew John, Who's Who 2013, A & C Black, 2013; online edn, Oxford University Press, Dec 2012
Dr Andrew Pocock, gov.uk

1955 births
Living people
Alumni of Queen Mary University of London
Alumni of Peterhouse, Cambridge
High Commissioners of the United Kingdom to Tanzania
Ambassadors of the United Kingdom to Zimbabwe
High Commissioners of the United Kingdom to Canada
High Commissioners of the United Kingdom to Nigeria
Knights Commander of the Order of St Michael and St George